Kloeckner Metals Corporation is a steel and metal distributor based in Roswell, Georgia. Kloeckner Metals Corporation's core business is the sale of steel and non-ferrous metals. The North American subsidiary of Klöckner & Co SE, Kloeckner Metals Corporation is the fourth-largest service center company in North America with 50 locations in North America servicing 8,000 metalworking businesses in the United States, Puerto Rico, Mexico, and Canada. In 2016, Kloeckner Metals Corporation reported sales of $2.6 billion.

History 
Kloeckner Metals Corporation was founded in 2011 when subsidiaries Macsteel Service Centers USA and Namasco merged.

In 2015, Kloeckner Metals Corporation announced the acquisition of sheet metal fabrication company American Fabricators.

In 2017, Kloeckner Metals Corporation announced a new 106,000-square-foot plant in University Park, Illinois and the expansion of its flat-rolled distribution center in Greenville, South Carolina. The same year, Kloeckner Metals Corporation announced the appointment of John Ganem as CEO beginning January 1, 2017.

Digitalization 
Kloeckner Metals Corporation has publicly shared a major commitment to the digitalization of the metals industry at large.

PVD 
In 2017, following partnership with Double Stone Steel, Kloeckner Metals Corporation announced investments in physical vapor deposition (PVD) that will introduce domestic PVD to the United States manufacturing industry on a large scale. Previously, large-scale projects and sourcing for PVD had to purchased offshore and imported.

Awards 
 In 2017, Kloeckner Metals Corporation was rated a top workplace by the Atlanta Journal-Constitution.
 In 2017, Kloeckner Metals Corporation's departing CEO, Bill Partalis, was named Executive of the Year by Metal Center News.

References

External links 

Commodity markets
Steel
Companies based in Roswell, Georgia